Golden Era Mixtape 2011 is a mixtape by all artists signed to Australian Hip hop label Golden Era Records. It was released as a free download on 17 January 2011 on the Golden Era Records website. In an interview about the mixtape on Triple J, Suffa of the Hilltop Hoods said that "everyone's been downloading it so much that the website has crashed". There is not going to be a commercial release of the album, although physical copies were distributed free with purchases of Golden Era releases and at gigs featuring Golden Era artists.

Track listing 

 Golden Era  – Intro
 Sesta & Suffa  – 99 Bottles (Cuts By DJ Reflux)
 Pressure  – The Fire
 Briggs  – Let It Burn (Cuts By DJ Jaytee)
 Funkoars  – Lock Me Up
 Vents  – Love Song
 DJ Reflux, DJ Debris & DJ Adfu  – Portion of the Raw
 Funkoars feat. Ash Grunwald  – Little Did I Know
 Vents & Trials feat. Mortar  – The Discrete Charm of the Bourgeiosie (Cuts By DJ Adfu)
 Briggs feat. Suffa  – The Wrong Brother (Remix)
 Briggs  – The Peoples Champ
 Vents  – Existential Absurdity
 Trials, Suffa, Briggs & Sesta  – Lunchroom Table
 Hilltop Hoods feat. Trials  – Debris Told Me
 Golden Era  – Interlude
 Hilltop Hoods  – Chase That Feeling
 Golden Era  – The Funkiest
Funkoars  – All I Need / Vamoose  – Where I Am (Medley)
 Vents  – Rollin' Balls
 Trials  – Baby C'mon

References

External links 
 Golden Era Mixtape 2011 website
 GoldenEraRecords.com.au
 Hilltop Hoods on Ping (iTunes)

2011 mixtape albums
Record label compilation albums
Hip hop compilation albums
Golden Era Records albums